James Blanco Martin (born July 21, 1961, in Hayward, California) is an American guitarist best known for his membership in the rock band Faith No More from 1983 to late 1993. He also played guitar with the groups EZ-Street, Vicious Hatred, Agents of Misfortune, Recluse, and Pigs of Death.

Martin was known for his long hair, bushy beard, and trademark red-rimmed glasses that he wears alone or over another darker pair of glasses.

Early career
In the early '80s, Martin was playing guitar in thrash band Vicious Hatred. During the '80s, he was an on-off member of the jamming band Spastik Children, also featuring schoolmate and close friend Cliff Burton and other members of Metallica.

Faith No More
Martin joined Faith No More in 1983, four years after the group's formation. He played on their albums We Care a Lot, Introduce Yourself, their breakthrough album The Real Thing with new vocalist Mike Patton replacing Chuck Mosley, and Angel Dust.

Following the release of Angel Dust, Martin left the group for reasons that remain unknown. On his now-defunct website, Martin stated The Real Thing was FNM's ideal album, both in the creative process and the touring afterward. The musical about-face that the band took with Angel Dust, including the change in focus from guitars to vocals, did not sit well with Martin. The extent to which Martin did or did not contribute to songwriting and recording on Angel Dust is a subject that the band for years never directly addressed, except to recognize his major influence on the track "Jizzlobber".

In an October 2016 PopMatters interview with Faith No More bassist Billy Gould, Gould addressed the controversy head-on about whether studio musicians or Martin played on Angel Dust:

"Gould sets the record straight. 'No studio musicians. He played, but the writing process was extremely difficult because he wasn't really much of a fan of the music. He wasn't really behind it. He wasn't really into it. So it was a tough process. I mean, I think, really, we realized that he wasn't going to continue while we were making that record because he was just on a different musical page.' The dynamic the band was in was similar to that which led to Mosley's termination. 'It could not have continued the way it did,' Gould says seriously."

Martin said in an interview, "My publicized 'not being into' 'Angel Dust' was all about the way the whole process went down. There was a lot of weird pressure to follow up 'The Real Thing', and as a consequence, the album 'Angel Dust' was more contrived musically than I thought was necessary."

The band fired Martin by fax on November 30, 1993, after the band had not progressed as they would have liked in rehearsals and songwriting. As an indication of the gulf that had formed between Martin and the rest of the band, they had recorded and released "Another Body Murdered" (with Boo-Yaa T.R.I.B.E. for the Judgment Night soundtrack) without his participation. Similarly, Martin produced and recorded material for the film Bill & Ted's Bogus Journey movie without the participation of other members of the band. Producer Matt Wallace later mentioned in The Real Story (a biographical book about Faith No More) that the death of Martin's father was a factor in the guitarist's departure.

On February 18, 2009, Roadrunner Records announced that Martin would not be participating in the rumored Faith No More reunion tour. On February 23, 2009, it was announced as part of a press release by Mike Patton that Faith No More would be reuniting for a string of European tour dates. On February 25, shortly after Patton's press release, Bill Gould announced a Faith No More reunion tour and identified the line-up, which excluded Martin. On July 16, 2010, Sirius XM Liquid Metal DJ Troy Hinson, reported that while he was backstage at Faith No More's Philadelphia appearance, Patton told him that Jim Martin was offered a chance to play with the band at one of their three San Francisco reunion tour dates in order to play the album Angel Dust in its entirety, but he declined.

Solo career
Martin's solo project was originally called The Behemoth but he changed the moniker after finding out about a Polish metal band already named Behemoth. His first and only solo album to date is entitled Milk and Blood, on which he covers his former band's song "Surprise! You're Dead", from The Real Thing.

Martin toured as lead guitarist with punk band Fang between 1998 and 2000.

He now lives in Castro Valley, California, with his wife, son, and daughter. He has gained fame in recent years for his non-musical endeavors in championship pumpkin growing.

In 2011, Martin joined Metallica on stage with Gary Rossington, Pepper Keenan, and Jerry Cantrell to play "Tuesday's Gone" as part of Metallica's 30th anniversary shows.  In 2013, he played guitar in the Infectious Grooves reunion at Orion Music + More festival at Belle Isle in Detroit, Michigan. In 2014, he once again joined Infectious Grooves on stage to celebrate the 50 year anniversary of the Whisky a Go Go. In November 2019, he returned to play with Infectious Grooves at the first Sick Bastards Festival organized by Mike Muir in São Paulo, Brazil.

Film appearance
In 1991, Martin appeared in Bill & Ted's Bogus Journey as "Sir James Martin, head of the Faith No More Spiritual and Theological Center" in the future. Martin's only lines in the film were "Station!" and "What a shithead."

Discography

As a band member
 Faith No More – We Care a Lot (1985)
 Faith No More – Introduce Yourself (1987)
 Faith No More – The Real Thing (1989)
 Faith No More – Angel Dust (1992)
 Voodoocult – Voodoocult (1995)
 The Behemoth – The Behemoth (1996)
 Jim Martin – Milk and Blood (1997)
 Fang – Fish and Vegetables (2000)
 Anand Bhatt and Jim Martin – Conflict (1999)
 Anand Bhatt, Jim Martin and Dave Campbell – Fire Woman: A Tribute To The Cult (2001) - "Lil Devil"
 Anand Bhatt and Jim Martin – Vivid Casting Call - Digital Remixes (2007)

As a featured musician
 Die Krupps – The Final Remixes (1994) - "Crossfire (Remixed by Jim Martin)"
 Metallica – ReLoad (1997) - "Low Man's Lyric"
 Metallica – Garage Inc. (1998) - "Tuesday's Gone"
 Primus – Antipop (1999) - "Eclectic Electric"
 Skitzo – Got Sick? (1999) - "Loner"
 Flybanger – Headtrip to Nowhere (2001) - "Cavalry" and "When Are You (Gonna Die)?"
 Echobrain – Echobrain (2002) - "Spoonfed"

References

External links

1961 births
Living people
American heavy metal guitarists
Faith No More members
Musicians from California
People from Oakland, California
American male guitarists
20th-century American guitarists
Voodoocult members
21st-century American guitarists
20th-century American male musicians
21st-century American male musicians